Lantanophaga is a genus of moths in the family Pterophoridae.

Species
Lantanophaga anellatus Rose and Pooni, 2003
Lantanophaga dubitationis Gielis & de Vos, 2006
Lantanophaga minima (B. Landry & Gielis, 1992)
Lantanophaga pusillidactyla (Walker, 1864)

Platyptiliini